Quaker Gardens can refer to:
Quaker Gardens, Islington, the former Quaker burial ground at Bunhill Fields, London 
Quaker Gardens, New Jersey, an unincorporated community